Jiivi is a 2019 Indian Tamil-language thriller film directed by V. J. Gopinath and written by Babu Tamizh. Jointly produced by M. Vellapandian, Sudalaikan Vellapandian and Subramanian Vellapandian. The film stars Vetri in the lead role, alongside an ensemble cast including Karunakaran, Monica Chinnakotla, Rohini, Ashwini Chandrashekar and Mime Gopi. The soundtrack album and background score was composed by K. S. Sundaramurthy, while art work, production controlling, executive production, line production were handled by Vairabalan, S. Nagarajan, Vivin S. R. and I. B. Karthikeyan, respectively. The film released on 28 June 2019 and was a successful venture. A sequel was released in 2022.

Plot 
Saravanan (Vetri) comes to Chennai from a small village in Madurai and works in a juice and tea stall where Mani (Karunakaran) is the "tea master".  Though not formally educated, Saravanan is well-read. Saravanan's lover Anandhi (Monica Chinnakotla) jilts him citing his meagre existence, which pushes him into depression. He decides to rob his landlady, Sivagami (Rohini) though she treats him as a brother. He then uses the knowledge that he has picked up over the years to plan and execute the crime, and proceeds to frame a neighbour he does not like.

After robbing his landlady's jewels, the incidents which happened in Sivagami's life starts to happen in Saravanan's life. He realizes that and do not want his sister to face the difficulties in life like Sivagami did. So, he starts thinking about how to stop this phenomenon and make things right. Meanwhile Kathir (Mime Gopi), Sivagami's hot-headed brother starts suspecting Saravanan.

The astounding similarities in his and Kathir's life and thought processes propels Saravanan to investigate the latter's past. He comes to the conclusion that Kathir had also committed a theft in his young age, stealing from Saravanan's grandfather, in the process framing Murugan, a colleague that he dislikes. Murugan is publicly arrested and shamed, over the cries of his despairing mother. Shortly after, Sivagami's daughter, Kavitha (Ashwini Chandrashekar), was born blind, and Sivagami's husband fell ill and was bedbound. Moreoever, Kathir's friend Kumar, whom Kathir repeatedly compares with Mani, dies in a railway accident, leaving his family destitue.

Saravanan later receives a call from his sister, who tells him that she is pregnant with a daughter, and that an astrologer has warned her husband to be careful of his health. Meanwhile, Kavitha falls into despair as the jewels that Saravan had stolen had been intended to be her wedding jewels, and her wedding is halted. Saravanan panics, and decides to stop fate's triangle from affecting his family. He quarrels with Mani, who one day takes the stolen jewels and runs away. On the same day, Kavitha attempts suicide and Saravanan rushes her to hospital.

Saravanan promises to marry Kavitha, despite Kathir's protests. Mani returns to see Saravanan, angry that the bag of jewels had been replaced with a bag full of clothing. Both men claim not to have been responsible for the switch and fight.

Ten months later, Saravanan is happily married to Kavitha and is a share auto driver. His niece is born with her eyesight and his brother-in-law remains healthy. Saravanan picks up Mani as a fare and the pair reconcile. Saravanan's internal dialogue reveals that he knows that Mani did not steal the jewels. Mani's flashback reveals that the bag full of jewels was accidentally swapped with another passenger's baggage on the bus. He had blamed Saravanan out of embarrassment and shame.

A final plot twist reveals that the passenger who had picked up the bag of jewels was, in fact, Murugan's son. Traumatised by how his innocent father had been treated by the police, he decides not to return the jewels and instead keep it for his young daughter. A photograph on the wall reveals that Murugan's mother had been blind.

Cast 

 Vetri as Saravanan
 Monica Chinnakotla as Anandhi
 Karunakaran as Mani
 Rohini as Lakshmi
 Rama as Sivagami
 Ashwini Chandrashekar as Kavitha
 Mime Gopi as Kathir
 Bosskey as Police Informer
 Anil Murali as Inspector Eshwar
 Tiger Garden Thangadurai as Sathish
 Kothandam as Drunk Tenant
 Thirunavukkarasu
 Muthupandi
 Ramesh Thiagarajan
 S. Meera

Soundtrack 

KS Sundaramurthy composed the songs and background score for the film. Yuvan Shankar Raja bought the audio rights of Jiivi under his banner, U1 Records. The Times of India gave a positive review for the album stating: "A job well done by Sundaramurthy!".

Release 
The film released on 28 June 2019, to mostly positive reviews.

Critical reception
The Times of India gave 3.5/5 stating that "Technically, too, the film is as slick as its writing, turning it into one of the memorable thrillers of the year", The reviewer also added "Jiivi is definitely one of the interesting lead characters we have seen in Tamil cinema in the last few years". The Hindu wrote "A surprisingly well-made thriller, whose individual parts are more terrific than its whole". Behindwoods rated 3/5 stating "Neat writing and engaging screenplay makes 'Jiivi' a good thriller. Try not to miss." Sify.com noted "Overall, Jiivi  joins the team of  interesting mystery thrillers released this year". Indiaglitz gave 3/5 and wrote "But what greets in the theatres is an intelligent little film that culminates to a largely satisfying climax". Dinamalar rated 3.5/5.Film Companion stated "It’s a marvellous idea, but this is a film you admire more for what it wants to be than what it is. The fabulous conceit needed equally fabulous filmmaking".Cinema Express rated 3 out of 5 stars stating "A competent thriller aided by its strong and flawless writing".

Sequel 
A sequel to this film called Jiivi 2 was released on 19 August 2022 directly on aha Tamil OTT Platform with all the cast members reprising their roles from this film.

References 

2019 films
2010s Tamil-language films
Indian thriller films
2019 thriller films